Sully–Morland is a station of the Paris Métro on line 7 of the Paris metro, located in the 4th arrondissement of Paris.

Location
The station is located under the Quai des Célestins, at the intersection of Boulevard Morland and Boulevard Henri-IV, near the Seine and the Pont de Sully. Oriented along a north-west/south-east axis, it is interspersed between the Pont Marie and Jussieu metro stations. Downstream of the station, in the direction of Mairie d'Ivry and Villejuif - Louis Aragon, the line makes a 90-degree bend towards the south-west and plunges under the Seine on a 40% slope towards Jussieu metro station.

History
Named after the Pont de Sully and the Boulevard Morland.  The Pont de Sully commemorates Maximilien de Béthune, Baron of Rosny, Duke of Sully (1560–1641), friend and Minister to King Henri IV. It crosses the Seine to the Île Saint-Louis and the Boulevard Saint-Germain. The Boulevard Morland was named after Colonel François-Louis Morlan (called "Morland", 1771–1805), who was killed at Austerlitz, with his body being repatriated in a barrel of rum.

Passenger services

Access
The station has four entrances, each consisting of a fixed staircase embellished with a Dervaux-style balustrade:
 entrance 1 - Boulevard Morland - Mairie de Paris - Préfecture de Paris, decorated with a Dervaux candelabrum, leading to boulevard Henri-IV at place du Père-Teilhard-de-Chardin, between rue de Sully and Boulevard Morland;
 entrance 2 - Rue de Sully located to the right of the Célestins barracks at no. 12 boulevard Henri-IV, at the corner with rue de Sully;
 entrance 3 - Boulevard Henri-IV, also equipped with a Dervaux mast located opposite no. 2 of the Quai des Célestins, at the corner with Rue du Petit-Musc and Boulevard Henri-IV;
 entrance 4 - Quai des Célestins comprising two entrances established back-to-back, leading to the right of no. 10, 12 and 14 of this same Quai.

Station layout

Gallery

References
Roland, Gérard (2003). Stations de métro. D’Abbesses à Wagram. Éditions Bonneton.

Paris Métro stations in the 4th arrondissement of Paris
Railway stations in France opened in 1930